Shizhong District is a district of the city of Zaozhuang, Shandong province, China.

Administrative divisions
As 2012, this district is divided to 6 subdistricts, 3 towns and 2 townships.
Subdistricts

Towns
Shuiguo
Mengzhuang
Qicun

Townships
Yong'an Township
Xiwangzhuang Township

References

External links 
 Xzqh.org

County-level divisions of Shandong